Jeaniene Frost (born 1974) is an American fantasy author, known for her Night Huntress series and the Night Huntress World novels. Foreign rights for her novels have sold to twenty different countries.

Bibliography

The Night Huntress series 
The Night Huntress series is a completed Urban Fantasy Romance series published by the Avon imprint of HarperCollins Publishers between 2008 and 2014. The series follows Catherine "Cat" Crawfield, a snarky and conflicted half-vampire college student who moonlights as a vampire hunter in a small Ohio town, until she meets a sexy and mysterious vampire bounty hunter named Bones who alters her views on the undead world for good. Later books follow Cat and Bones as the navigate their relationship and various dangers of the undead world.

The Night Huntress: Bones' POV Series

The Night Huntress World Series

The Night Prince series

The Night Rebel series

Broken Destiny series

Anthologies and other works
Pack (March 9, 2009)
Night's Darkest Embrace (October 26, 2010)

Critical reception 
Frost's novels have garnered mostly positive reviews and have been well received by critics and she has had multiple New York Times bestsellers. Her first novel Halfway to the Grave (2007) won the Romantic Times Reviewers' Choice Award (RT Award) in the Urban Fantasy category, Eternal Kiss of Darkness (2010) and Once Burned (2012) won the Romantic Times Reviewers' Choice Awards for Best Vampire Romance, and the final book in the Night Huntress series Up From the Grave (2014) won the Romantic Times Reviewers' Choice Award for Best Urban Fantasy Worldbuilding.

References

External links

1974 births
Living people
21st-century American novelists
American fantasy writers
American romantic fiction writers
American women short story writers
American women novelists
Urban fantasy writers
Women science fiction and fantasy writers
Women romantic fiction writers
21st-century American women writers
21st-century American short story writers